Maroochydore Multi Sports Complex is a multi-purpose community sports facility located in Maroochydore, Sunshine Coast, Queensland.

Overview

Maroochydore Multi Sports Complex has three floodlit ovals for Australian rules football, three soccer pitches and more than 20 floodlit outdoor netball courts. The complex regularly hosts community events for these sports, and has also hosted a pre-season Australian Football League (AFL) match in 2012. The Brisbane Lions women's team played several of their home matches throughout the 2022 season at the complex, prior to moving to their permanent ground in Springfield in 2023. Maroochydore Football Club plays home matches in various AFL Queensland sanctioned leagues at the facility. 

In 2020 the venue underwent a $2.7 million upgrade that included construction of a new multi-sport field with hybrid turf, as well as improved lighting, interchange boxes for players, coaches boxes and additional earth mounds for spectators. Consequently the complex was a training hub for at least five AFL clubs in the COVID-19 effected 2020 and 2021 seasons, including 2021 premiers the Melbourne Football Club.

The venue was selected to host the 2020 Australian Football International Cup event prior to its cancellation due to the COVID-19 pandemic.

References

External links
Maroochydore Multisports Complex at Austadiums

Brisbane Lions
AFL Women's grounds
Sports venues in Queensland
Sport in the Sunshine Coast, Queensland
Buildings and structures on the Sunshine Coast, Queensland
Sports complexes in Australia